Safe from the Losing Fight is the 2003 debut album released by Kids in the Way.

Track listing
"We Are"
"Moving Mountains"
"Never Say Die"
"Hallelujah"
"Phoenix with a Heartache"
"Love" (Justin McRoberts cover)
"Scars That Save"
"This Fire We Started Made Wreckage of All That We Know"
"Stars Fall On"
"These Are the Days"
"Your Knife, My Back"	
"The End"

Personnel 

 Dave Pelsue – vocals
 Nathan Ehman – guitar
 Austin Cobb – guitar
 Nathan Hughes – bass guitar, backing vocals
 Eric Carter – drums

References 

2003 debut albums
Kids in the Way albums
Flicker Records albums